Neoparamoeba is a genus of Amoebozoa. Species contain intracellular kinetoplastid parasites, of the genus Perkinsela, which are maintained in close contact with the nucleus and are considered obligatory and mutualistic.

References

Amoebozoa genera
Discosea